H. L. "Hub" Hollis Field is a baseball venue located in Paris, Texas and the home of the Paris Junior College Dragons baseball team. The facility is named after the school's first Athletic Director and Head Football Coach, who worked in the 1920s.

References

Baseball venues in East Texas
Baseball venues in Texas